Tron: Evolution - Battle Grids is a video game based on the 2010 film Tron: Legacy and the Wii and Nintendo DS version of the third-person action-adventure tie-in video game by the same name. Its storyline predates that of the other versions. The video game was developed by n-Space and published by Disney Interactive Studios.

Release
The game was released in both NTSC and PAL territories.

Championship Edition
An exclusive edition of the game was released for Toys R Us called Tron: Evolution - Battle Grids [Championship Edition]. It included the three-wheeled out runner light cycle for use by the player.

Gameplay
Players create their own playable character known as programs to battle and defeat enemies in Tron: Evolution - Battle Grids. The game allows players to roam around the world of Tron in Grid Tanks, Light Cycles, Recognizers or on foot for hand-to-hand combat. The game features Story mode which includes many games and some small hubs. In each hub there are programs with jobs, or quests that the player can complete for bits (bits can also be found scattered around the hubs) and use them for further customization to the Players' program. There is a cheat code system for unlocking in-game elements. Up to four players can play at the same time in local multiplayer.

Modes
Grid Games features several games for players to play. This mode goes up to 4 players. Grid Games features Light Cycle arena, Light Cycle Races, Disc Arena, Light Runner Arena, Light Runner Races, HyperBall and Tanks.
Story Mode is the campaign and where players can play the main story of the game. The player will play countless Grid Games to become the Champion of the Grid Games.
Championship Mode is where players can pick any 4 to 8 Grid Games and play them as rounds in a Grid Championship Game. This mode goes up to 4 players.

The Wii version supports the use of Wii MotionPlus, but only in HyperBall, where it allows players to perform advanced shots when launching and returning the ball. The Light Cycle and Light Runner modes can also be played with the Wii Wheel.

Plot
The game revolves around a Program designed and named by the player. The story begins with the Program battling Quorra (voiced by Olivia Wilde) with light cycles. The Program wins and goes to Tron City where he/she meets Quorra. The Program and Quorra become friends. Quorra finds Zuse who takes them to Tron's palace to find a trainer for the Program. They meet with Tron (voiced by Bruce Boxleitner), and he fights the program to see if he/she is championship material. Afterwards, he tells the player's program that if he/she wins the championship he/she would be the first ISO champion. This could give ISOs someone to look up to.

The program then trains with Calchas for the upcoming matches. After a few training sessions the program goes through an official match. One of Calchas' trainees, angry that he was not chosen to participate, challenges the player's program. If the player wins, Quorra then suggests to head for the next match in light cycles. On his/her way, the program is attacked by a grid bug. Both the program and Quorra fall off the track, and are attacked by a swarm of grid bugs. The Program wakes up in a colony, where a Survivalist named Gibson has taken the player's program to. He informs the program of how he saved both. On deciding to leave, Gibson says the program must repay him, because he sacrificed valuable resources to save him/her. The program agrees to compete in multiple games, wins, and allowed to leave and return to Tron City. After the program and Quorra get back to Tron City, they begin the Light Tank battle against Bosh. The program wins, but then discovers that Calchas was in a Light Cycle Race against Blaze. This results in Calchas being derezzed by Blaze. The Program then goes to Tron's Palace and tells Tron what occurred. When they both return to Tron City, they find out that Quorra had been kidnapped, and Blaze had threatened and hinted that if the program participated in the final match, he/she would possibly be derezzed. Then Gibson, who had come to watch the Tournament, tells the program that he saw where both Bosh and his henchmen drag her away to; so the program battled his/her way through the Elite Guards, across the Light Sail Station to Bosh, derezzed him and saved Quorra. Then both the program and Quorra hurried to the final event just in time, which was a Light Cycle battle against Blaze. The program wins, and after Blaze attempts and fails to derezz him, the user Kevin Flynn himself gave the trophy to the first ISO champion of the Grid Games.

Reception

The game received "mixed or average" reviews on both platforms according to the review aggregation website Metacritic.

References

External links
 

2010 video games
Action-adventure games
Nintendo DS games
Evolution: Battle Grids
Video games developed in the United States
Wii games
Works set in computers